Lisec is a small dispersed settlement in the hills north of Kneža in the Municipality of Tolmin in the Littoral region of Slovenia.

References

External links
Lisec on Geopedia

Populated places in the Municipality of Tolmin